2008 Auckland Open was a darts tournament that took place in Auckland, New Zealand on 20 September 2008.

Results

Men

Women

References

2008 in darts
2008 in New Zealand sport
Darts in New Zealand
September 2008 sports events in New Zealand